Road Trips Volume 1 Number 2 is a live album by the American rock band the Grateful Dead, the second in their "Road Trips" series of archival releases.  It was recorded in October 1977, and released on February 4, 2008.

Road Trips Volume 1 Number 2 contains material from four different concerts, recorded over a two-week period at venues in New Mexico, Oklahoma, Texas, and Louisiana.

Portions of the 10/11/77 show from Norman, Oklahoma can also be found as bonus tracks on Dick's Picks Volume 29.

Track listing

Personnel

Grateful Dead

 Jerry Garcia – lead guitar, vocals
 Donna Godchaux – vocals
 Keith Godchaux – keyboards
 Mickey Hart –  drums
 Bill Kreutzmann – drums
 Phil Lesh – electric bass
 Bob Weir – rhythm guitar, vocals

Production

Produced by Grateful Dead
Compilation produced by David Lemieux and Blair Jackson
Recorded by Betty Cantor-Jackson
Edited and mastered by Jeffrey Norman at Garage Audio Mastering
Cover art by Scott McDougall
Photos by Bob Minkin and Ed Perlstein
Package design by Steve Vance
Liner notes written by Steve Silberman

Sound quality

A label on the CD case for Road Trips Volume 1 Number 2 states, "The compact discs herein have been digitally remastered directly from original analog reel-to-reel tapes.  They are historical snapshots, not modern professional recordings, and may therefore exhibit occasional technical anomalies and unavoidable ravages of time."

The album was released in HDCD format.  This provides enhanced sound quality when played on CD players with HDCD capability, and is fully compatible with regular CD players.

Concert set lists

The complete set lists for the October 7, 11, 14 and 16, 1977 Southwest Tour concerts from which this recording was taken were:

University of New Mexico, Albuquerque, New Mexico – 10/7/77
First Set: "Mississippi Half-Step Uptown Toodeloo", "Jack Straw", "Peggy-O", "El Paso", "They Love Each Other", "Big River", "Dupree's Diamond Blues", "Let It Grow", "Deal"
Second Set: "Samson & Delilah", "Sunrise", "Ramble On Rose", "Passenger", "Terrapin Station", "Playing in the Band", "Drums", "Iko Iko"**, "The Wheel"**, "Wharf Rat"**, "Sugar Magnolia"**
Encore: "One More Saturday Night"

Lloyd Noble Center, Norman, Oklahoma – 10/11/77
First Set: "Help on the Way"*, "Slipknot!"*, "Franklin's Tower"*, "Jack Straw", "Peggy-O", "El Paso", "Sunrise"**, "Deal", "Let It Grow"*
Second Set: "Dancin' in the Streets"***, "Dire Wolf"***, "Estimated Prophet", "Eyes of the World", "Not Fade Away"***, "Wharf Rat"***, "Around and Around"***

Hofheinz Pavilion, Houston, Texas – 10/14/77
First Set: "Jack Straw", "Mississippi Half-Step Uptown Toodeloo"*, "El Paso"*, "Brown-Eyed Women", "New Minglewood Blues", "Loser"**, "Passenger", "Friend of the Devil", "Me & My Uncle", "Tennessee Jed", "The Music Never Stopped"
Second Set: "Bertha", "Good Lovin'", "Candyman", "Playing in the Band"*, "Drums", "The Wheel", "Wharf Rat", "Around and Around"
Encore: "Brokedown Palace"*, "Playing in the Band"*

Assembly Center, Baton Rouge, Louisiana – 10/16/77
First Set: "Promised Land", "Sugaree"*, "Cassidy", "Loser", "New Minglewood Blues", "Friend of the Devil", "Sunrise", "Dire Wolf", "The Music Never Stopped"*
Second Set: "Scarlet Begonias"**, "Fire on the Mountain"**, "Estimated Prophet"**, "Drums"*, "The Other One"*, "Good Lovin'"*, "Terrapin Station"*, "Black Peter"*, "Around and Around"*
Encore: "U.S. Blues"

* appears on Road Trips Volume 1 Number 2
** appears on bonus disc
*** appears on Dick's Picks 29

References

Road Trips albums
2008 live albums